Conasprella elokismenos is a species of sea snail, a marine gastropod mollusk in the family Conidae, the cone snails and their allies.

Like all species within the genus Conasprella, these snails are predatory and venomous. They are capable of "stinging" humans, therefore live ones should be handled carefully or not at all.

Description
The size of an adult shell varies between 45 mm and 68 mm.

Distribution
This marine species occurs in the Indo-Pacific off Madagascar and KwaZuluNatal, South Africa; also in the Bismarck Sea off Papua New Guinea.

References

 Röckel, D., Korn, W. & Kohn, A.J., 1995. Manual of the living Conidae. Volume 1: Indo-Pacific region. Hemmen: 517 pp
 Röckel, D., Richard, G. & Moolenbeek, R., 1995. Deep-water Cones (Gastropoda: Conidae) from the New Caledonia region. Mémoires du Muséum national d'Histoire naturelle 167: 557–594
 Filmer R.M. (2001). A Catalogue of Nomenclature and Taxonomy in the Living Conidae 1758–1998. Backhuys Publishers, Leiden. 388pp.
 Tucker J.K. (2009). Recent cone species database. September 4, 2009 Edition
 Puillandre N., Meyer C.P., Bouchet P. & Olivera B.M. (2011) Genetic divergence and geographic variation in the deep-water Conus orbignyi complex (Mollusca: Conoidea). Zoologica Scripta 40(4): 350–363.
 Puillandre N., Duda T.F., Meyer C., Olivera B.M. & Bouchet P. (2015). One, four or 100 genera? A new classification of the cone snails. Journal of Molluscan Studies. 81: 1–23

External links
 The Conus Biodiversity website
 
 Holotype in the MNHN, Paris

elokismenos
Gastropods described in 1975